Ar-Ruwais is a city located some  west of Abu Dhabi City, in the Western Region of the Emirate of Abu Dhabi. "Al Ruwais" is largely dropped in relation to the Ruwais Refinery and other industrial development.

The Ruwais industrial and housing complex has been developed by ADNOC as a major contributor to the national economy and represents a series of multimillion-dollar investments by the company. Once a small fishing headland from which a handful of people scratched a seasonal living, Ruwais today is one of the most modern industrial complexes in the Middle East.

In the 1970s, plans were laid to transform a remote desert site into a self-contained industrial town, geared to fulfilling the downstream requirements of Abu Dhabi's booming oil and gas industry. Centered on Takreer's Ruwais Refinery, the complex was officially inaugurated in 1982 by Sheikh Zayed bin Sultan Al Nahyan, the late President of the UAE and Ruler of Abu Dhabi, and the visionary behind Abu Dhabi's remarkable development and prosperity. In addition to the original -per-day refinery, which was expanded in 1985 with the commissioning of a  hydro cracker complex, major facilities at Ruwais include a natural gas liquids fractionation plant operated by Abu Dhabi Gas Industries Ltd (GASCO), a fertilizer plant run by Ruwais Fertilizer Industries (FERTIL), a Petrochemical Complex by Abu Dhabi National Polymers Company (Borouge), a marine terminal and a sulfur handling terminal.

Ruwais has also been developed into a model 'new town' with an evolving population. The complex has its own shops, schools, banks, mosques, clinic and hospital, and a wide range of sporting and leisure amenities including a beach club and an 'in-house' TV station. Although originally designed to house the workers who support the oil and gas industry, Ruwais has grown to include other government workers of nearby projects, such as Barakah Nuclear Power Plant.

Climate

The climate of Ruwais is similar to Abu Dhabi, which is a hot desert climate (Köppen climate classification BWh). July is the hottest month, with average maximum temperatures above 40°C. Sandstorms occur intermittently, in some cases reducing visibility to a few meters.

On average, January is the coolest month in the year. Since the Tropic of Cancer passes through the emirate, the southern part falls within the Tropics. However, despite the coolest month having a  average, its climate is far too dry to be classed as tropical.

RHC Hospital and Clinic
A purpose-built local, modern general hospital opened in 2012 to cater for medical, clinical and dental needs of residents. The hospital is administered by the Medical Services Division of the Administration Directorate. Ruwais Hospital is a 36-bed acute-care facility providing the full range of general and emergency medical services, including cardiology, maternity, pediatrics, dentistry and ophthalmology, on both an outpatient and inpatient basis. The emergency department, staffed by highly skilled medical officers and well-trained nurses, is open 24 hours a day and operates a round-the-clock ambulance service, not only for ADNOC employees and their families but the whole of the immediate neighborhood. Ambulance crews are on hand, for example, to attend LO road accidents along the highway between Tarif and Sila. The RHC Clinic is now fully integrated with Ruwais Hospital, and provides a comprehensive health-care programme to all residents of the housing complex. It offers a wide range of general practitioner and specialist services, including nursing and child welfare, immunization and vaccination, school health, dental and physiotherapy services. Ruwais Housing Complex is managed by Ruwais Housing Division, part of the ADNOC Administration Director.

Schools
Education in Ruwais consists of 2 main types of schools, those are Public and Private School, including one university (The Higher Colleges of Technology for Girls and Boys, or HCTGB)). The Main Private Schools are:
 Adnoc Schools (formerly known as The Glenelg School of Abu Dhabi)
 SABIS International School - Ruwais (formerly known as Ruwais Private School or The International School of Choueifat - Ruwais)
 The Asian International School (AIS)

The Main Public Schools are:
 Al Abbas Bin Abdul Muttalib Primary And Secondary School for Boys (AABAMPSSB)
 Amrah Bint Abd Al Rahman Secondary School for Girls (ABAARSSG)
 Nahrawan Primary School for both boys and girls. (NHPBBG)

References

External links
Ruwais Housing Complex - News and ads for the Ruwais community

Populated places in the Emirate of Abu Dhabi
Western Region, Abu Dhabi